Chester Herald of Arms in Ordinary is an officer of arms at the College of Arms in London. The office of Chester Herald dates from the 14th century, and it is reputed that the holder was herald to Edward, Prince of Wales, also known as the Black Prince. In the reign of King Richard II the officer was attached to the Principality of Chester, which was a perquisite of the then Prince of Wales. In the reign of King Henry VIII the title lapsed for a time but, since 1525, the office of Chester has been one of unbroken succession, as a herald in ordinary. The badge of office is taken from the arms of the Earl of Chester and in blazoned as A Garb ensigned of the Royal Crown Or.  

On 22 September 2017 The Honourable Christopher John Fletcher-Vane was appointed to the office. He was Portcullis Pursuivant from 2012 to 2017. Born in 1953 in Cumbria, the second son of William Fletcher-Vane, 1st Baron Inglewood, he was for many years a barrister in Newcastle upon Tyne.

Holders of the office

See also
 Heraldry
 Officer of arms

References
Citations

Bibliography
 The College of Arms, Queen Victoria Street: being the sixteenth and final monograph of the London Survey Committee, Walter H. Godfrey, assisted by Sir Anthony Wagner, with a complete list of the officers of arms, prepared by H. Stanford London, (London, 1963)
 A History of the College of Arms &c, Mark Noble, (London, 1804)

External links
The College of Arms
CUHGS Officer of Arms Index

Offices of the College of Arms